Dreamland: The Burning of Black Wall Street is a 2021 American documentary film, directed and produced by Salima Koroma. LeBron James serves as an executive producer under his SpringHill Entertainment banner. The film follows the cultural renaissance existing in the Tulsa, Oklahoma district, and investigates the Tulsa race massacre.

It was released on May 31, 2021, by CNN.

Synopsis
The film follows the cultural renaissance which is currently taking place in the Tulsa, Oklahoma district, and it also investigates the Tulsa race massacre.

Production
In June 2020, it was announced that Salima Koroma would direct and produce a documentary film about the Tulsa race massacre, with LeBron James who is set to serve as an executive producer under his SpringHill Entertainment banner.

Release
In October 2020, CNN Films acquired U.S. distribution rights to the film. It was released on May 31, 2021.

References

External links
 
 

2021 films
2021 television films
2021 documentary films
2020s English-language films
American documentary television films
CNN Films films
Works about the Tulsa race massacre
2020s American films